Mee is a surname, and may refer to
 Ada Mee, German artist
 Arthur Mee (1875-1943), British journalist and encyclopedist
 Arthur Butler Phillips Mee (1860-1926), British journalist and editor
 Benjamin and Duncan Mee, owners of Dartmoor Zoological Park whose story is told in We Bought a Zoo.
 Ben Mee (b. 1989), an English footballer
 Bertie Mee (1918–2001), British football player and manager
 Charles L. Mee (b. 1938), American playwright
 Dom Mee, British sailor
 Georgie Mee (1900–1978), English footballer
 George L. Mee - rancher in King City, California hospital named for him George L. Mee Memorial Hospital
 Han Mee, vocalist of English rock band Hot Milk
 Henry Mee (b. 1955), a British painter
 James Mee, American arresting sheriff in the Mel Gibson DUI incident
 Jennifer Mee (b. 1991), American woman once known as the 'hiccup girl', now controversially serving life without parole for setting up a robbery that ended in murder
 Margaret Mee (1909–1988), British artist
 Michael Mee (b. 1985), a Canadian ice dancer
 Michie Mee (b. 1970), Canadian rapper
 Sarah Jane Mee (b. 1979), British television presenter
 Steven Mee (b. 1965), an English cricketer
 Tommy Mee (1890-1981), an American Baseball player

See also
 Mees (disambiguation)

eo:MEE
it:MEE